HMS Viper was the Massachusetts privateer schooner Viper that  captured on 26 September 1776. The Royal Navy purchased Viper in 1777. She then was broken up in New York in 1779.

Massachusetts service and capture
Viper was on her first cruise in 1776 under her captain, Commander Benjamin Wormell (or Wormwell), when the British captured her. The notice in the London Gazette, under the heading "By the Perseus", simply states: "Viper, B. Wornwell, Master, Martin and  Co. Owners; from Boston, on a Cruize; fitted as a Privateer."

British service
The Admiralty bought Viper for £349 1s 9d on 17 July 1777. However, she may already have been active in the Royal Navy's service for some time, in fact, from not long after her capture. The same issue of the London Gazette that reported her capture had a long list of vessels captured between 10 March and 31 December 1776. That list includes 10 small prizes "By the Viper".

Four boats on a fishing voyage from Piscataqua, carrying fish: 
May Flower, S. Crossman master and owner; 
Dover, A. Fuinald, master and owner; 
Endeavor, J. Bitlou, master and J. Batson, owner; 
Two Brothers, J. Bowden, master  and owner 
Two abandoned boats, one with fire wood and one with empty casks. 
Pelly, on a fishing voyage, carrying fish.
Three vessels carrying lumber and shingles from Macchias, two to Newberry: 
Louisa,  J. Colston, master and St. New, owner; 
Unity, J. Lord, master and Jones, owner;
Nancy, R. Adams master, but belonging to the Congress. Unfortunately, there was another  in the theater at the same time, a 10-gun sloop. It is not clear which Viper affected these captures, or even whether some are due to one and others to the other.

In 1777 Viper, schooner of 10 guns and 50 men, was under the command of Lieutenant Edward Packenham. On 29 December she was damaged by river ice.

On 7 May 1778, Viper was part of a squadron that accompanied some gallies, barges and troops up the Delaware River from Philadelphia to Trenton. Over a three-day period they burned 44 American vessels and captured a battery of six guns, all without suffering a single casualty. Seven of the vessels were privateers, pierced for from 10 to 18 guns.

On 13 June,  and Viper captured a schooner at Rustigouche. She was on a cruise from Salem and they sent her into Halifax, together with her stores.

Fate
Viper was broken up at New York in October 1779. This rendered moot the 19 February 1780 order from the Admiralty that she be sold.

Citations

Privateer ships
1776 ships
Captured ships
Schooners of the Royal Navy
Ships built in Massachusetts